The following is a list of notable events and releases of the year 1971 in Norwegian music.

Lars Levin guitarist and keyboardist of Greenhouze, born 04.12.1971

Events

May
 The 19th Bergen International Festival started in Bergen, Norway.

June
 The 8th Kongsberg Jazz Festival started in Kongsberg, Norway.

August
 The 12th Moldejazz started in Molde, Norway.

September
 5 – The 1st Kalvøyafestivalen started at Kalvøya near by Oslo.

Albums released

Unknown date

A
 Arild Andersen
 Underwear (ECM Records), with Bobo Stenson and Jon Christensen

G
 Jan Garbarek
 Sart (ECM Records), with Bobo Stenson, Terje Rypdal, Arild Andersen, and Jon Christensen

R
 Terje Rypdal
 Terje Rypdal (ECM Records)

V
 Jan Erik Vold
 HAV (Philips Records), with Jan Garbarek

Births

 January
 5 – Stian Carstensen, multi-instrument, entertainer, and composer (Farmers market).
 26 – Helge "Deathprod" Sten, ambient artist and record producer.

 February
 1 – Siri Gjære, jazz singer.
 16 – Øyvind Brandtsegg, electronica and jazz percussionist, programmer and composer.

 April
 2 – Solveig Slettahjell, jazz singer and composer.
 25 – Trygve Seim, jazz saxophonist and composer.
 26 – Christian Wallumrød, jazz pianist, keyboardist, and composer.

 May
 12 – Kristin Asbjørnsen, jazz singer and composer.
 15 – Erland Dahlen, jazz drummer and percussionist.

 June
 7 – Håvard Fossum, jazz saxophonist, flautist, composer and music arranger.
 29 – Ingar Zach, jazz percussionist and businessman.

 July
 12 – Unni Wilhelmsen, singer, songwriter and musician.
 15 – Jacob Holm-Lupo, guitarist, composer, and music producer.

 September
 23 – Ingebrigt Håker Flaten, jazz upright bassist.

 October
 17 – Kim Ljung, bassist, guitarist, keyboardist, and vocalist.
 19 – Helén Eriksen, jazz saxophonist, vocalist, songwriter and music arranger.
 24 – Frode Berg, upright bassist.

 December
 17 – Rita Engedalen, vocalist, guitarist, and songwriter.
 18 – Tommy Tee, record producer, rapper, broadcaster, record executive, concert promoter and magazine publisher.

 Unknown date
 Isak Rypdal, music producer and founder of Crab Key Records.

See also
 1971 in Norway
 Music of Norway
 Norway in the Eurovision Song Contest 1971

References

 
Norwegian music
Norwegian
Music
1970s in Norwegian music